Giuseppe Perracini or Peracini (Mirandola, 1672 – Bologna, 1754) was an Italian painter, active in a late Baroque style.

Biography
He trained under Giovanni Francesco Cassana of Modena, and then moved to Bologna, where he trained under Marcantonio Franceschini. Painting mainly history and sacred subjects, he was known as il Mirandolese. He painted an altarpiece for the church of San Martino Maggiore. He also painted many portraits. Among his pupils was Giuseppe Andreoli.

References

1672 births
1754 deaths
17th-century Italian painters
Italian male painters
18th-century Italian painters
Painters from Bologna
Italian Baroque painters
18th-century Italian male artists